is located in Fuchu, Tokyo, Japan. Built in 1933 for horse racing, it is considered the "racecourse of racecourses" in Japanese horseracing. It has a capacity of 223,000, with seating for 13,750.

Tokyo Racecourse hosts numerous G1 (Grade 1) races, including the Japan Cup, Tokyo Yushun (the Japanese Derby) and the Yasuda Kinen, a part of the Asian Mile Challenge.

Physical attributes
Tokyo Race Course's grass course measures 2083m (1¼ miles + 234 feet) with two chutes (1800m and 2000m). Races can be run on the "A Course" rail setting (on the hedge), the "B Course" setting (rail out 3 meters), the "C Course" setting (rail out 6 meters), the "D Course" setting (rail out 9 meters) or the "E Course" setting (rail out 12 meters).

The dirt course measures 1899 meters (1⅛ mile + 290 feet), with a 1600m chute.

The jump course measures 1675 meters (1 mile + 215 feet).

There was a chute for 3200m races (used for the Tenno Sho Autumn races), but when the race was shortened to 2000m, the 3200m chute was useless and is not in use as of today.

The course was renovated in 2007 (started in 2000), adding the world's largest video screen and upgrading a grandstand, named the "Fuji View Stand", which in today is the main grandstand of the course. The "Memorial 60" grandstand was also added.

Transportation
The racecourse is linked to Fuchūkeiba-seimommae Station by a footbridge.

Notable races

Notes

References

Sports venues in Tokyo
Horse racing venues in Japan
Western Tokyo
Fuchū, Tokyo
Sports venues completed in 1933
1933 establishments in Japan